Reichenstein Castle, also known as Falkenburg is a castle in the UNESCO World Heritage Site of the Upper Middle Rhine Valley.  It stands on a mountain spur on the eastern slope of the Bingen Forest, above the Rhineland-Palatinate municipality of Trechtingshausen in the Mainz-Bingen district in Germany.

Sources and external links

http://www.caltim.com/reichenstein/#The%20History%20of%20Reichenstein
http://www.burg-reichenstein.com
http://www.regionalgeschichte.net/mittelrhein/trechtingshausen/kulturdenkmaeler/burg-reichenstein.html

Reichenstein (Rhein)
Museums in Rhineland-Palatinate
Historic house museums in Germany